Edward Brennan may refer to:
Eddie Brennan (born 1978), Irish hurler and manager
Edward A. Brennan (1934–2007), American businessman
Ned Brennan (1920–1988), Irish politician
Edward Brennan (philanthropist) (1784–1859), British philanthropist lived and died in India